Hockey Newfoundland and Labrador (HNL) is the governing body of all amateur hockey ice hockey in Newfoundland and Labrador, Canada.  Hockey Newfoundland and Labrador is a branch of Hockey Canada.

History
Hockey Newfoundland and Labrador (HNL) was founded as the Newfoundland Amateur Hockey Association (NAHA) on December 20, 1935 in the St. John's Law offices of Robert S. Furlong on 315 Duckworth Street to govern hockey in all regions of Newfoundland. Furlong was the first President of NAHA and kept that position until 1952.

Don Johnson was elected president of the NAHA in 1966 and wanted to expand minor ice hockey as one of its permanent programs. He expected that the NAHA could join the Canadian Amateur Hockey Association (CAHA) within five years if the terms of affiliation were acceptable, and to be admitted independent of and equal to the Maritime Amateur Hockey Association. He sought for the CAHA to accommodate more NAHA requests than in previous offers of affiliation, which included the NAHA keeping regulations which allowed a paid player-coach and the occasional professional player on a roster. The NAHA also wanted its senior league to have shorter playoffs for the Allan Cup instead of an interlocking schedule with teams from the Maritimes. In May 1966, Johnson reached an agreement with CAHA president Lionel Fleury who accepted the NAHA as a branch member for the 1966–67 season. Johnson stated that despite Newfoundland becoming Canada's tenth province in 1949, the NAHA took 17 years to affiliate with the CAHA "through lack of information, misinterpretation of correspondence and other factors".

The following year, a Newfoundland championship team participated in the Allan Cup playoffs for the first time. NAHA was renamed the Newfoundland & Labrador Hockey Association (NLHA) in 1999 and later renamed Hockey Newfoundland & Labrador (HNL).

Trophies and awards

Junior hockey
The Veitch Memorial Trophy is awarded to the junior champion team.

Senior hockey
The Herder Memorial Trophy is awarded to the senior championship team.
The Evening Telegram Trophy is awarded to the senior hockey team with the best record (best winning average) in the regular season.

The Gus Soper Memorial Award is presented to the most valuable player in NL senior hockey in the regular season.
The President's Award is presented to the top goaltender in NL senior hockey in the regular season.
The Howie Clouter Memorial Trophy is presented to the most gentlemanly and effective player in NL senior hockey in the regular season.

S. E. Tuma Memorial Trophy

The S. E. Tuma Memorial Trophy is awarded to the top scorer in NL senior hockey in the regular season.

In 1968 Corner Brook businessman Elias Tuma donated a trophy as a memorial to his late father Simon to be presented annually to the most prolific scorer in the Newfoundland Senior Hockey League (NSHL). The trophy was first presented at the end of the 1968-1969 season.

The NSHL ceased operations in 1989 and the trophy was not awarded in 1990, 1991 or 1992.  From 1993 though 2011, the S.E. Tuma Memorial Trophy was awarded to the top scorer of the active provincial senior "A" leagues. The Newfoundland Senior Hockey League reformed for three seasons from 2011-2014. The trophy was not awarded in 2015 but since 2016 it has once again been awarded to the top scorer of the active provincial senior "A" leagues.

Note: AESHL = Avalon East Senior Hockey League, AWSHL = Avalon West Senior Hockey League, CBSHL = Central Beothuck Senior Hockey League

Leagues and associations
Senior hockey
Avalon East Senior Hockey League
Central West Senior Hockey League
West Coast Senior Hockey League

Junior leagues
St. John's Junior Hockey League (Junior "B")
Central/West Junior Hockey League (Junior "B")

Defunct leagues
West Coast Senior Hockey League
Newfoundland Hockey League
Newfoundland Senior Hockey League

See also
List of ice hockey teams in Newfoundland and Labrador

References

Bibliography

External links
Hockey NL Website
NAHA history on nlhhs.org

Newfoundland
Ice hockey in Newfoundland and Labrador
New
Sports governing bodies in Newfoundland and Labrador